Muhammad Fahmi bin Mohd Sabri (born 1999) is a Malaysian professional footballer who plays as a midfielder.

References

External links
 

1999 births
Living people
Malaysian footballers
Association football midfielders
UiTM FC players
Malaysia Super League players